Alfred John Mengert (April 7, 1929 – April 6, 2021) was an American professional golfer.

Biography
Born and raised in Spokane, Washington, he was the son of local businessman Otto Mengert and his wife Otelia Johnson, who was the sister of U.S. Racing Hall of Fame jockey Albert Johnson. 

Mengert played football at Gonzaga Prep, briefly attended Stanford University in the late 1940s, and served in the Washington Air National Guard and U.S. Air Force in the early 1950s. Mengert was first reserve for the 1951 Walker Cup team. He was runner-up in the 1952 U.S. Amateur to Jack Westland.

Mengert turned professional in 1952 and worked mainly as a club pro while also playing on the PGA Tour. He won several non-PGA Tour events. His best finish in a major came at the 1958 Masters Tournament. After three rounds, he was tied for fourth, two shots off the lead, and finished tied for ninth. Mengert was the first round leader at the U.S. Open in 1966 at the Olympic Club in San Francisco. He was tied for seventh after 54 holes, but a final round 81 resulted in a tie for 26th place. He finished tied for third place in a rain-delayed Tucson Open in 1971. Mengert played several tournaments on the Senior PGA Tour in the 1980s, and was inducted into the Pacific Northwest Golf Association's Hall of Fame in 2001.

After turning pro in 1952, Mengert's first job was as an assistant club pro under Masters champion Claude Harmon at Winged Foot, north of New York City. He was a head pro at clubs in New Jersey, St. Louis, and Sacramento. Mengert returned to the Northwest as the head pro at Tacoma Country Club in the 1960s then went to Oakland Hills in the suburbs north of Detroit, Michigan.

Mengert died April 6, 2021.

Amateur wins
1946 International Jaycee Junior Golf Tournament
1947 International Jaycee Junior Golf Tournament
1949 Washington State Amateur
1950 Mexican Amateur, Pacific Northwest Amateur, Washington State Amateur

Tournament wins
this list may be incomplete
1952 Northwest Open (as an amateur)
1957 New Jersey State Open
1958 New Jersey State Open
1960 New Jersey State Open, New Jersey PGA Championship, Metropolitan Open, Arizona Open
1963 Washington Open
1964 Washington Open
1965 Washington Open, Northern California PGA Championship, British Columbia Open
1966 Northwest Open
1968 Pacific Northwest PGA Championship
1969 Pacific Northwest PGA Championship
1971 Washington Open
1976 Michigan PGA Championship

Results in major championships

Note: Mengert never played in The Open Championship.

CUT = missed the half-way cut (3rd round cut in the 1964 PGA Championship)
"T" indicates a tie for a place

References

External links

PNGA Hall of Fame

American male golfers
PGA Tour golfers
PGA Tour Champions golfers
Golfers from Washington (state)
Gonzaga Preparatory School alumni
Washington National Guard personnel
Sportspeople from Spokane, Washington
1929 births
2021 deaths